The Dewey Medal was a military decoration of the United States Navy which was established by the United States Congress on June 3, 1898. The medal recognizes the leadership of Admiral of the Navy George Dewey, during the Spanish–American War, and the Sailors and Marines under his command.

Criteria
The Dewey Medal was created to recognize the forces of the U.S. Navy and United States Marine Corps who participated in the Battle of Manila Bay. To be awarded the Dewey Medal, a service member must have served on one of the following naval vessels on May 1, 1898. There were 1,848 men of the Navy and Marine Corps eligible for the Medal:
 
 
 
 USRC McCulloch
 
 
 

This is probably because 1. the ships were not actively engaged in the battle and 2. they were, at that time, civilian crewed ships purchased to support the Navy. Nanshan was commanded by Lieutenant Benjamin W. Hodges, USN but technically remained a merchant ship so she could resupply at neutral ports which simplified the squadron's logistics. Zafiro was commanded by Ensign Henry A. Pearson, USN and, like Nanshan, was technically a merchant ship at the time of the battle. Both ships were later commissioned in the Navy. 

The Dewey Medal was a one-time only decoration and there were no devices or campaign stars authorized to the medal. The medal consists of a circular medallion, upon which rests an image of Admiral George Dewey, suspended from a blue and yellow ribbon. Admiral Dewey was awarded the medal, although, out of modesty, he always wore it with the medal's reverse displayed which depicted a sailor sitting on a gun.   Dewey had the rare distinction of being one of only four Americans entitled to wear a medal with their own image on it. The others were Rear Admiral William T. Sampson (Sampson Medal), Rear Admiral Richard E. Byrd (1st and 2nd Byrd Antarctic Expedition Medals) and General of the Armies John J. Pershing (Army of Occupation of Germany Medal).

The medal was recognized as being given for active military duty; yet because it recognized a single battle in a single campaign, the Dewey Medal was a commemorative medal. When worn on a military uniform the Dewey Medal was considered senior to the Sampson Medal, although there were no individuals who received both medals.

The Dewey Medal is one of a very few United States military awards to have fewer recipients than the Medal of Honor, which numbers just over 3,500 as of 2021.  Only 1,825 medals were struck in the original Navy order to Tiffany and Company, each machine engraved on the edge to the recipient with his name and rate (enlisted) or rank (officer), and his ship's name engraved on the back.

Appearance
This medal was designed by celebrated artist Daniel Chester French, who sculpted the statue of a seated Lincoln in Washington's Lincoln Memorial and the Minuteman statue at Concord, Mass. The medal was struck by Tiffany & Co. The front, or obverse, depicts a bust of Commodore George Dewey. On the back, or reverse, is included the name of the vessel on which the recipient served. The name of the recipient is engraved on the medal's lower rim, this being one of only two service medals issued officially named to the recipient.

References

1898 establishments in the United States
Awards and decorations of the United States Navy
Awards established in 1898
Spanish–American War